Alscot is a hamlet in Buckinghamshire, England. It is in Princes Risborough parish, on the A4129 between Princes Risborough and Longwick.

Hamlets in Buckinghamshire
Wycombe District